Massimo Brunelli (born 27 July 1961) is an Italian former cyclist. He competed in the team pursuit event at the 1984 Summer Olympics.

References

External links
 

1961 births
Living people
Italian male cyclists
Olympic cyclists of Italy
Cyclists at the 1984 Summer Olympics
Cyclists from Milan